The 2019–20 Ranji Trophy was the 86th season of the Ranji Trophy, the first-class cricket tournament that took place in India. It was contested by 38 teams, divided into four groups, with ten teams in the Plate Group. The group stage ran from 9 December 2019 to 15 February 2020. The top team in the Plate Group progressed to the quarter-finals of the competition.

In January 2020, in the round six fixture between Meghalaya and Manipur, Manipur were bowled out for only 27 runs in their first innings. On 12 February 2020, the fixture between Chandigarh and Manipur was the 60,000th first-class cricket match to be played.

In the final round of matches, Goa qualified from the Plate Group, after beating Mizoram inside two days.

Points table

Fixtures

Round 1

Round 2

Round 3

Round 4

Round 5

Round 6

Round 7

Round 8

Round 9

References

Ranji Trophy seasons
Ranji Trophy Plate Group
Ranji Trophy
Ranji Trophy